Bratilloc (Serbian Cyrillic: Братиловце) is a village in Kamenica municipality, Kosovo. It is located in the Gollak mountains.

Demographics 
As of 2011 the village has 29 inhabitants, all of whom are Albanian.

References 

Villages in Kamenica, Kosovo